KWAY-FM (99.3 FM, "Y 99.3") is a radio station broadcasting a Contemporary Hit Radio music format and KWAY Country AM 1470 FM 96.3 has country music ranging from modern to classic. Licensed to Waverly, Iowa, United States, the station serves the Waterloo-Cedar Falls area. The station is currently owned by Ael Suhr Enterprises, Inc. The studios, transmitter, and towers are located on the south side of Waverly, at 110 29th Avenue SW.

The station features national news programming from Fox News Radio.  Programming is highlighted by the morning show, The Breakfast Club, with Matt Ray and Taylor Nitz.  Local news and sports coverage is also a staple of KWAY's programming on its FM, 99.3, and AM, 1470 and FM 96.3, stations.

References

External links

WAY-FM
Adult top 40 radio stations in the United States